(August 24, 1795 – October 8, 1859) was a Japanese daimyō of the Edo period, who ruled the Tokushima Domain. His court title was Awa no kami.

Family
 Father: Hachisuka Haruaki
 Mother: Tsuyo no Kata
 Wives:
 Jouhime (1792-1820) daughter of Ii Naonaka
 Takatsukasa Tsuneko (1799-1837) daughter of Takatsukasa Masahiro (adopting Hachisuka Narihiro and Hachisuka Kazuko)
 Concubines:
 Miyake-dono
 Koda-dono

Ancestry

References

1795 births
1859 deaths
Hachisuka clan
Tozama daimyo